Brommella falcigera is a spider species found in Europe.

See also 
 List of Dictynidae species

References

External links 

Dictynidae
Spiders described in 1935
Spiders of Europe